Evan Zhu (born August 15, 1998 in Ann Arbor, Michigan) is an American tennis player.

Zhu has a career high ATP singles ranking of 495, achieved on October 14, 2019. He also has a career high ATP doubles ranking of 371 achieved on August 12, 2019. He has reach 3 singles finals, boasting a record of 1 win and 2 losses. Additionally, he has reached 9 doubles finals with a record of 3 wins and 6 losses. All 12 of the finals he has reached have been on the ITF Futures Tour. 

Zhu made his ATP main draw doubles debut at the 2018 Hall of Fame Tennis Championships doubles tournament, where he partnered Martin Redlicki having received a wildcard into the tournament. At UCLA, he and Martin Redlicki were the 2018 NCAA doubles champions, defeating the team of Martin Joyce and Mikael Torpegaard of Ohio State, 6-7 (8), 7-6 (4), 1-0 (9), on May 28, 2018.

His older sister, Amy Zhu, is also a professional tennis player playing on the WTA Tour.

ATP Challenger and ITF Futures/World Tennis Tour finals

Singles: 5 (1–4)

Doubles: 10 (3–7)

References

External links

1998 births
Living people
American male tennis players
UCLA Bruins men's tennis players
Tennis people from Michigan
Sportspeople from Ann Arbor, Michigan